Sunxiuqinia dokdonensis is a facultatively anaerobic bacterium from the genus of Sunxiuqinia which has been isolated from deep sub-seafloor sediments from the Dokdo Island.

References

Bacteroidia
Bacteria described in 2013